is a railway station  in the village of  Matsukawa, Nagano Prefecture, Japan, operated by East Japan Railway Company (JR East).

Lines
Hosono Station is served by the Ōito Line and is 22.8 kilometers from the terminus of the line at Matsumoto Station.

Station layout
The station consists of one ground-level side platform serving a single bi-directional track. The station is unattended.

History
The station opened on September 29, 1915 when Shinano Railway extended the operation from Ariake Station to Ikeda-Matsukawa Station (present-day Shinano-Matsukawa Station). Shinano Railway was integrated into the Japanese Government Railways on June 1, 1937. With the privatization of Japanese National Railways (JNR) on April 1, 1987 the station came under the control of JR East.

Surrounding area

See also
 List of railway stations in Japan

References

External links

 JR East station information 

Railway stations in Nagano Prefecture
Ōito Line
Railway stations in Japan opened in 1915
Stations of East Japan Railway Company
Matsukawa, Nagano (Kitaazumi)